Iakovou, or Iacovou, is a surname of Greek-Cypriot origin, meaning "son of Jacob", that may refer to:

Georgios Iacovou (born 1938), Cypriot diplomat and politician
Hrisostomia Iakovou (born 1971), Greek distance runner at the 2000 Olympics
Khristos Iakovou (born 1948), Greek weightlifter at the 1972 Olympics
Lazaros Iakovou (born 1976), Cypriot footballer

Greek-language surnames
Surnames
Patronymic surnames
Surnames from given names